"1 Thing" is a song by American singer Amerie from her second studio album, Touch (2005). Written by Amerie and Rich Harrison and produced by the latter, the song is influenced by go-go rhythms and features a prominent sample of the Meters' 1970 funk recording of "Oh, Calcutta!", written by Stanley Walden. Its lyrics focus on an unidentified "thing" that fuels a romantic attraction.

The song was released as the album's lead single on January 18, 2005, and is the only single from the soundtrack to the 2005 romantic comedy film Hitch. "1 Thing" received acclaim from critics, and peaked at number eight on the US Billboard Hot 100 and number four in the United Kingdom, becoming Amerie's first top-10 single. Its digital download and ringtone releases were each certified gold by the Recording Industry Association of America (RIAA). A remix of "1 Thing" features rapper Eve.

The song earned Amerie a nomination for Best Female R&B Vocal Performance at the 2006 Grammy Awards, and was also nominated for Choice R&B/Hip-Hop Track at the 2005 Teen Choice Awards. It was later named the 22nd and 25th best song of the 2000s decade by Rolling Stone and Robert Christgau, respectively.

Conception and release
In 2004, when working on her second album, Amerie enlisted the services of producer Rich Harrison, who had helped produce and write her first album. In May 2004, Harrison heard "Oh, Calcutta!" for the first time and began working on the beat accompanying the ten-second back-and-forth breakdown between Meters drummer Ziggy Modeliste and guitarist Leo Nocentelli. Harrison said he loved the work of the Meters, especially Modeliste, commenting, "Ziggy, he's crazy." He processed the way the breakdown could be "flipped", added a bongo drum, a cowbell, and a ride cymbal, and sent it to Amerie. According to Harrison, they wrote and finished the song in two to three hours.

Amerie's manager, Len Nicholson, felt the song was "the single" to release. When executives at Amerie's label, Columbia/Sony Urban Music, heard "1 Thing", they felt that the song's choruses needed to be "bigger". They recommended that more music be added to the percussion-focused beat, but Harrison and Amerie replied that adding more to the beat would overpower the song.  Harrison and Amerie returned to the studio several times to rework the track.  Each time they submitted a new version to the label, Columbia told them that the song sounded unfinished, but was unable to specify what should be changed.  The label continued to refuse to release "1 Thing"; in Amerie's words, "People just weren't getting it".

Later in 2004, six months after recording "1 Thing", Amerie and Harrison leaked it to US radio stations in an attempt to get it released officially. The response from DJs and listeners was positive, and it consequently received airplay across the country. Columbia Records attempted to suppress the song because it was an unofficial release, and because Jennifer Lopez (another artist on the label) had expressed interest in recording the song for her own album, Rebirth.  Radio stations refused to retract the song from their playlists, and Columbia eventually began promoting "1 Thing" as a single, making it a last-minute addition to the Hitch soundtrack. Lopez settled on another Harrison-produced, funk-infused track, the Usher outtake "Get Right". The song was officially serviced to American urban radio stations on January 18, 2005.

Theme and sound

"1 Thing" was produced by Harrison and is built around a sample of the Meters' 1970 version of the theme song from the musical Oh! Calcutta!, "Oh, Calcutta!", written by Stanley Walden. Built around The Meters' funky beat-driven percussion, "1 Thing" finds Amerie lamenting an aspect of a relationship that keeps her satisfied. Even if other factors are less than positive, there is one thing that keeps her hooked ("It's this one thing that's got me trippin'"). Amerie said that the inspiration for the song came from a conversation she had with Harrison "about relationships and how there's always one thing that keeps you attracted to someone. No matter what they do or how they act, there's that one undeniable thing that keeps you coming back." She told Blender that the "one thing" "could be bringing flowers, or something more ... physical. People think I'm just this good girl, but there are other sides they don't see."

Despite being based on a New Orleans funk sample, the song belies a strong go-go influence.  Harrison likened the two based on their heavy use of percussion and chant. Amerie stated, "You don't hear go-go outside of D.C. ... I was like, 'We have to do it in an up-tempo way because when you hear it on the radio in D.C., it's fast.' ... So it's a fresh sound for everybody but people in the D.C./Maryland/Virginia area. They [already] know what it is."

Critical reception
"1 Thing" received acclaim from music critics. In its review of Touch, Rolling Stone named the song "an early front-runner for song-of-the-summer status," also ranking it the number one single of 2005. Pitchfork stated that Harrison "knows something about horns, big glorious ascending heavenly anthemic horns" and "drums, huge sweaty riotous back-and-forth second-line old-school Clyde Stubblefield drums." AllMusic described "1 Thing" as being "just as exciting" as "Oh, Calcutta!" for how it "[flails] all over the place with unbound joy".

The song received second place behind Kanye West's "Gold Digger" on the 2005 Pazz & Jop list, a survey of several hundred music critics conducted by Robert Christgau. Blender ranked "1 Thing" number 191 on its list of "The 500 Greatest Songs Since You Were Born". It praised the song's "cascading drums...and Amerie's frantic, top-of-her-range vocals". Calling it "a pretty fucking smart move to wrap perfect pop around a question that stays open all night", Pitchfork listed the song as the second best single of 2005, behind Antony and the Johnsons' "Hope There's Someone". The song was ranked 32nd on Pitchfork's top 500 songs of the 2000s, and the publication included "1 Thing" in its collection of The Pitchfork 500. Christgau named it the 25th best song of the 2000s. Björk also dubbed it the "Best! Song! Ever!"

The song received a nomination for Best Female R&B Vocal Performance at the 48th Grammy Awards, but lost to Mariah Carey's "We Belong Together".

Commercial performance
"1 Thing" became Amerie's most commercially successful song. In the United States, it debuted at the bottom of the Billboard Hot 100 on February 12, 2005.  The song gradually climbed the chart over a 10-week period, peaking at number eight on the chart dated April 23, 2005, and exited the chart after a total of 20 weeks. Additionally, the single topped the Hot R&B/Hip-Hop Songs chart in on April 30, 2005, while reaching numbers 13 and 28 on the Rhythmic Top 40 and Pop 100 charts, respectively. The song was certified gold by the Recording Industry Association of America (RIAA) in October 2005 for digital sales and in June 2006 for ringtone sales.

In the United Kingdom, "1 Thing" debuted and peaked at number four on the UK Singles Chart in late May 2005. It went on to spend 14 weeks on the chart and became the 38th best-selling single of 2005. In neighboring Ireland, the single debuted at number 10 on the Irish Singles Chart. It climbed to number six in two weeks, remaining on the chart for another nine weeks. "1 Thing" was successful in continental Europe, where it peaked at number 13 on the European Hot 100 Singles chart. It reached the top 10 in Denmark, Finland, and Norway; the top 20 in Belgium and the Netherlands; and the top 40 in France, Germany, Sweden, and Switzerland.

Music video, covers, and other uses
The music video for "1 Thing", directed by Chris Robinson and Amerie, revealed to the public the singer's sexual side. It focuses on her dance routines, featuring her as a go-go dancer in various setups, intercut with footage from the film Hitch.  Amerie co-directed the video with Chris Robinson after she approached him with the video's concept in mind.  The two collaborated again when directing the music video for the following single, "Touch".

Lauryn Hill sampled "1 Thing" during the second and last part of "Doo Wop (That Thing)" during live performances.  Girls Aloud used the song as an interlude in performances of its 2004 single "Love Machine" during its 2006 Chemistry Tour.  Foo Fighters member Dave Grohl showed the video for "1 Thing" during 24 Hours of Foo, during a segment in which each member of the band presented one song that they considered their "guilty pleasure". Alternative rock band Elbow covered the song in a comedic fashion for an August 2005 performance on BBC Radio 1's Live Lounge.  "1 Thing" was used in the PlayStation 2 karaoke game SingStar R&B. The Sweden-based Norwegian singer-songwriter Ane Brun covered the song in an acoustic style on her 2013 album Rarities. A cover of the song by British duo Peter and Kerry is featured on Late Night Tales: Bonobo. The Irish singer-songwriter Hozier performed "1 Thing" during concerts in 2014 and 2015.

"1 Thing" was played during the pole dancing scene in the film Somewhere, and featured in episodes of the shows Girlfriends (S8E08 "Save the Last Dance", first aired November 26, 2007) and Entourage. The song can also be heard in the soundtracks for video games Saints Row 2, Everybody Dance, The Hip Hop Dance Experience and Grand Theft Auto V.

Remixes
The song's only official remix features guest vocals from rapper Eve, and an alternate version of the music video was created for it. Amerie said that she chose Eve to appear on the remix because most other female R&B singers were accompanied by male rappers, and that Eve "epitomizes that whole independent fearless female doing her thing. She's fashionable and very much a woman even though she definitely has a lot of attitude, the strength that most would attribute to men. ... With '1 Thing' being such an aggressive track, it was perfect to see two females really doing it."

A second remix features Fabolous, a third features B.G., and little-known Torontonian producer Satya Rock arranged an extended underground remix to feature E-40, Method Man, Lyrics Born, One Be Lo, Dres, Joe Budden, Talib Kweli,  Beanie Sigel, Edan, MF DOOM and Jay-Z.  Siik remixed "1 Thing" by using instrumentals from a song by Japanese producer Nujabes.  Stylus Magazine listed Siik's remix seventh on its list of the top ten remixes of 2005 and commented that "it's enough to warrant a whole change of venue, from the sizzling pep of the dance floor to the silk luxury of the bedroom."  Most of the unofficial remixes were released on mixtapes, and Amerie said that she liked them all, particularly those by Fabolous, B.G., and Juelz Santana.

Track listings

UK and European CD single
 "1 Thing" (radio edit) – 4:02
 "1 Thing" (radio version featuring Eve) – 3:34

UK and European enhanced maxi-single
 "1 Thing" (radio edit) – 4:02
 "1 Thing" (featuring B.G.) – 4:13
 "Talkin' to Me" (Mark Ronson Sunshine remix – no loop) – 3:06
 "1 Thing" (instrumental) – 3:59
 "1 Thing" (video) – 4:01

US 12-inch single
A1. "1 Thing" (album version) – 4:01
A2. "1 Thing" (instrumental) – 3:59
A3. "1 Thing" (a cappella) – 3:55
B1. "1 Thing" (remix featuring Eve) – 4:13
B2. "1 Thing" (remix featuring B.G.) – 4:13

Credits and personnel
Credits adapted from the liner notes of Touch.

Recording and management
 Recorded at Sony Music, New York City, and Night Flight Studios, Fort Washington, Maryland
 Mixed at The Hit Factory, New York City
 Mastered at Sterling Sound, New York City
 Published by Mi Suk Publishing (ASCAP) controlled and administered by Universal Music Corp. (ASCAP)/EMI Blackwood Music, Inc. (BMI)  itself and Dam Rich Music (BMI)/EMI U Catalog Inc. (ASCAP)

Personnel
 Amerie – vocals
 Rich Harrison – production
 Jocelyn McElroy – background vocals
 Bram Tobey – recording assistance
 Tony Maserati – mixing
 Tom Coyne – mastering

Charts

Weekly charts

Year-end charts

Certifications

Release history

References

2005 singles
2004 songs
Amerie songs
Columbia Records singles
Eve (rapper) songs
Music videos directed by Chris Robinson (director)
Song recordings produced by Rich Harrison
Songs written by Amerie
Songs written by Rich Harrison